Briane Harris (born March 11, 1992 as Briane Meilleur) is a Canadian curler from Petersfield, Manitoba. She currently plays lead on Team Kerri Einarson from Gimli, Manitoba. She has also won three Grand Slam of Curling events with the Einarson rink.

Career
Harris had a fairly successful junior career playing third for Breanne Knapp, winning the Manitoba junior title in 2010 and 2011 and competing in the 2010 and 2011 Canadian Junior Curling Championships. She won the bronze medal in 2011.

She began her senior career as a skip in the 2011–12 season, and played in her first Grand Slam, the 2011 Manitoba Lotteries Women's Curling Classic.

After playing for several different teams, she began to skip her own rink again in the 2016–17 and 2017–18 season. She competed in the 2017 Road to the Roar Canadian Olympic Curling Pre-Trials with Breanne Knapp, Janelle Vachon, and Sarah Neufeld, but the team missed out on a chance to qualify for the trials following losses to Julie Tippin and Krista McCarville.

For the 2018–19 season, Harris joined Kerri Einarson's new team as the lead. The team gained some attention for being made up entirely of former skips. They began the season by winning three straight World Curling Tour events in three weeks: the 2018 Stu Sells Oakville Tankard, the inaugural Morris SunSpiel and then the Mother Club Fall Curling Classic with a fourth win at the Curlers Corner Autumn Gold Classic in October. In December, the team lost in the finals of the 2018 Canada Cup and 2018 National. Their strong play during the early part of the season earned them enough points to put team Einarson in the Wild Card game at the 2019 Scotties Tournament of Hearts. However the team lost to the lower ranked Casey Scheidegger rink. The team would rebound to have a strong finish at the end of the season, winning the 2019 Players' Championship and losing in the final of the 2019 Champions Cup.

Team Einarson had two playoff finishes at the first two Slams of the 2019–20 season, losing to Anna Hasselborg in the quarterfinal of the Masters and once again to Hasselborg in the final of the Tour Challenge. The team did not have the same success at the Canada Cup as they did in 2018, finishing with a 2–4 record. However, at the 2020 Manitoba Scotties Tournament of Hearts, her team succeeded. They finished the round robin and championship round with a 7–1 record which qualified them for the final. In the final, they defeated Jennifer Jones. It was Harris' first Manitoba Scotties Tournament of Hearts provincial title. Team Einarson represented Manitoba at the 2020 Scotties Tournament of Hearts, where they continued their success. They finished first in the round robin with a 9–2 record and then won the 1 vs. 2 page playoff game, qualifying them for the final. Harris would win her first Canadian Championship when they defeated Rachel Homan 8–7 in and extra end. The team was set to represent Canada at the 2020 World Women's Curling Championship before the event got cancelled due to the COVID-19 pandemic. The Scotties would be their last event of the season as both the Players' Championship and the Champions Cup Grand Slam events were also cancelled due to the pandemic.

Team Einarson returned to the Scotties Tournament of Hearts in 2021 as Team Canada. They went 7–1 in the round robin, with their only loss coming against Ontario's Rachel Homan. This qualified them for the championship round. There, they won three games and lost one to Manitoba's Jennifer Jones. They advanced to the playoffs as the second seed, defeating Alberta's Laura Walker 9–3 in the semifinal. In the final, they defeated Homan to win their second consecutive Scotties gold. A month later, Harris was back in the Calgary bubble to compete with Mark Nichols at the 2021 Canadian Mixed Doubles Curling Championship. The pair failed to qualify for the playoffs, posting a 3–3 round robin record. Harris returned to the bubble for a third time in April 2021, along with her women's team to play in the two only Grand Slam events of the abbreviated season. The team made it to the semifinals of the 2021 Champions Cup where they lost to Team Homan, but got their revenge at the 2021 Players' Championship a week later, where they beat Homan in the final. The following week, Team Einarson represented Canada at the 2021 World Women's Curling Championship. The team had a slow start to the event, falling to 1–5 after their first six games. They turned things around, however, winning six of their seven remaining round robin games to qualifying for the playoffs. They then faced Sweden's Anna Hasselborg in the qualification game, which they lost 8–3.

The Einarson rink had a slow start to the 2021–22 season, failing to win any of their first five tour events. Their best finish came at the 2021 Sherwood Park Women's Curling Classic where they lost in the final to Tracy Fleury. The team reached the quarterfinals of the 2021 Masters, however, then missed the playoffs at the 2021 National. At the 2021 Canadian Olympic Curling Trials, the team went through the round robin with a 4–4 record. This earned them a spot in the first tiebreaker, where they defeated Casey Scheidegger 8–6. They then faced Krista McCarville in the second tiebreaker, where they lost 4–3 and were eliminated. The team's next event was the 2022 Scotties Tournament of Hearts in Thunder Bay, Ontario. Through the round robin, the defending Scotties champions posted a perfect 8–0 record, earning a spot in the playoffs. They then lost in the seeding round to New Brunswick's Andrea Crawford, meaning they would have to win three straight games to defend their championship title. In the playoffs, the team won the 3 vs. 4 page playoff against Team Fleury and then defeated New Brunswick's Crawford in the semifinal to reach the Scotties final where they would face Northern Ontario's McCarville rink. After controlling the entire game, Team Einarson sealed the victory with a steal of one in the tenth end. With the win, they became just the fourth team to win three consecutive Scotties titles. They then went on to represent Canada at the 2022 World Women's Curling Championship, where they fared much better than in 2021. The team finished the round robin tied for second place with a 9–3 record, however, due to their draw shot challenge, finished third overall. This placed them in the qualification game where they defeated Denmark's Madeleine Dupont to advance to the semifinal. There, they took on South Korea's Kim Eun-jung. After taking control in the seventh end, South Korea stole the ninth and tenth ends to hand the Canadian team a 9–6 loss. They were able to rebound in the bronze medal game with an 8–7 victory over Sweden's Anna Hasselborg. Team Einarson wrapped up their season at the final two Slams of the season. At the 2022 Players' Championship, they made it all the way to the final where they were defeated by the Hasselborg rink. At the 2022 Champions Cup, the team secured their fourth Grand Slam title as a foursome with a 10–6 victory over Gim Eun-ji.

Personal life
Harris currently works as a CAD Technician for EuroCraft Office Furnishings. She married Tory Harris in August 2022.

Teams

References

External links

Living people
1992 births
Canadian women curlers
Curlers from Winnipeg
Canada Cup (curling) participants
Canadian women's curling champions